Nairamdal Peak or Friendship Peak is the one of five peaks of the Tavan Bogd mountain and it marks the border tripoint between Russia, Mongolia, and China. The Peak towers at the elevation of 4,082 m ( 13,392 ft).

See also 
 Khüiten Peak
 Malchin Peak
 List of Altai mountains

References 

Altai Mountains
Mountains of Mongolia
Mountains of Russia
China–Mongolia border
Mongolia–Russia border
China–Russia border
International mountains of Asia
Border tripoints
Mountains of Xinjiang
Four-thousanders of the Altai